Mortimer Softley (born 16 March 1975), better known by his stage name Natural Black, is a reggae singer from Guyana.

Biography
Mortimer Softley was born in Georgetown, Guyana.  He moved to Jamaica in 1995 to pursue his dream of being a reggae singer. In Guyana he hailed from Linden in the community of Albouystown and was nicknamed Black and White because of his love for dressing in that colour code. In Jamaica the musicians he hung around would rename him Natural Black.  On his arrival into the island he worked as a welder and coffee picker while recording in his spare time for various producers.  He made the rounds voicing for the likes of Anthony Red Rose, Gordon Lee, Jack Scorpio, Freddie McGregor and Beres Hammond. Some producers released material and others didn't but of the singles that came out all suffered for lack of promotion. His fortunes however began to change when in 2000 he met Roger Grant, a young producer just starting his label Organic Records. This association resulted in two singles, "With Feeling" and "Bad Mind" which captured the audiences attention and brought him his first taste of success.  Both songs charted followed by in the Streetz' "Never Leave You Lonely" which peaked at number three on the Star charts.  Grant became his manager and capitalised on the popularity of the singles by booking him on major shows like Sting, Reggae Sumfest and Rebel Salute.  His promising career was further bolstered with frequent touring in France, Switzerland, and Sweden among other territories. Around this fertile period he also saw the release of his first album Spiritual Food on French label Patate followed by World War on Lionroots. His manager migrated to the US in 2004 and Natural Black scored in 2006 for producer Don Corleon with the chart topping "Far From Reality". The artist continues to record prolifically but has not being able to consistently maintain a high public profile.  His career it seems his stuck in the stages of potential and the Guyanese hope is yet to truly conquer his adopted homeland.

Natural Black has fans in the Caribbean, Europe, the United States and Latin America and is currently signed to Vision Sound Studios of Guyana. He possesses a distinctively smooth and mellow voice, and parlays a style of his own. He is solidly in the forefront of the newroots and culture movement. He is a regular among the top record producers and show promoters. Over the years he's recorded with Organic, King Jammys, 5th Element, Rootsdown, In The Streetz, Lustre Kings, Addis, 321 Strong, Firehouse, Harmony House, Digital B, Lion Paw, Big Yard, Kickin', Young Blood, No Doubt and Maximum Sound, amongst others. He is closely associated with fellow deejays Norris Man and Perfect and often voice tunes in joint sessions over the same riddims with them.

Natural Black tours extensively and has performed to sold out audiences in Switzerland, Germany, Holland, Austria, France, Italy and Slovenia. He has performed on most of the major Reggae shows and festivals such as Uppsala Reggae Festival, Reggae Sumfest, Sting, Rebel Salute, East Fest and others. P.G. Music's Marlon McCubbin produced his 1995 album Far From Reality (Greensleeves) – easily Natural's biggest success thus far.

In 2007 he was sentenced to a $2000 fine and 120 hours of community service after pleading guilty to charges of disorderly conduct, indecent language, resisting arrest and being armed with an offensive weapon (a ratchet knife), after being arrested at Norman Manley International Airport. He was arrested again in October that year on suspicion of stealing a car, although he was released after spending seven days in custody.

In May 2012 he cut his locks because he was not living a Rastafarian lifestyle.

Discography
Spiritual Food (2003) (Organic/Patate)
World War (2003) (Organic/Lionroots)
Far From Reality (2006), Greensleeves
Jah Guide (2007), Greensleeves
Cool Nuh Black (2007), Vizion
Love Gonna Conquer Evil (2007), Cousins
Naturally Black (2008)
Guardian Angel (2009)
Hot New Singles (2013)
No Prejudice (2014)

References

External links
 Biography at Reggae.ch

People from Georgetown, Guyana
Guyanese reggae singers
Living people
1975 births
21st-century Guyanese male singers